Basil Clement Alderson Patchitt (8 August 1900 – 2 July 1991) was an English international footballer who earned two caps for the England national team in 1923, captaining the team on both occasions. Patchitt, who played as a right half, played club football for Cambridge University, Corinthian and Castleford Town. He had earlier attended Charterhouse School.

See also
 List of England international footballers born outside England

References

1900 births
1991 deaths
English footballers
England international footballers
Cambridge University A.F.C. players
Corinthian F.C. players
Castleford Town F.C. players
People educated at Charterhouse School
Alumni of Trinity College, Cambridge
Association football midfielders